Merav Shinn Ben-Alon (1965) is a multidisciplinary artist based in Tel Aviv. Her work has included work based on clothing.

Biography 
Merav Shinn Ben-Alon is a multidisciplinary artist based in Tel Aviv. She holds a master's degree with honors from the Interdisciplinary Program in the Arts, Tel Aviv University, studied at the New York Studio School, NYC and earned her bachelor's degree with honors from the Bezalel Academy of Arts and Design, Jerusalem.  She was a two-time recipient of the 'Artistic Encouragement Award' from the Israeli Ministry of Culture, won the America–Israel Cultural Foundation Prize and received an excellence award twice during her graduate studies.

In 2001 she developed work based on T shirts and uniforms called "Stitches".

Her works were presented, inter alia :Mark Rothko Art Centre (Daugavpils Latvia) Watari Museum of Contemporary Art (Tokyo) Museum of Art (Tel Aviv) Museum of Art (Haifa) Museum of Art (Petach –Tikva) The Israel Museum (Jerusalem) and at further art institutions such as Hakibbutz Art Gallery (Tel Aviv) and Zenit Gallery (Copenhagen)

References

External links 
 Merav Shin Ben-Alon 
 Haaretz, Aug 04 2014 
 Collaborators at Ein Harod by Galia Bar-Or 
 Collaborators PDF Catalogue 
 Jerusalem Post July 27 2001 
 Petach Tikva Museum of Art, Curator Revital Ben-Asher Peretz 
 Haifa Museum of Art, Curator Ruti Direktor 
 Tel Aviv Artist's Studios TLV 
 Information Center for Israeli Art, The Israel Museum Jerusalem

1965 births
Living people
20th-century Israeli women artists
21st-century Israeli women artists
Artists from Tel Aviv
Tel Aviv University alumni
Bezalel Academy of Arts and Design alumni